Strâmbeni may refer to several villages in Romania:

 Strâmbeni, a village in Căldăraru Commune, Argeș County
 Strâmbeni, a village in Suseni Commune, Argeș County

See also 
 Strâmbu (disambiguation)